Akdeniz University Stadium is a multi-use stadium at Akdeniz University, Antalya, on the Mediterranean coast of Turkey. It is home to the Turkish Süper Lig team Antalyaspor since June 2012.

References

External links
Turkish Football Federation
www.stadiumguide.com profile

Football venues in Turkey
Sports venues completed in 2012
Sport in Antalya
Buildings and structures in Antalya